Schuh is a footwear retailer based in Scotland.

Schuh may also refer to:
 Leder und Schuh, European shoe company
 Schuh (surname)